São Paulo de Frades is a former civil parish in the municipality of Coimbra, Portugal. The population in 2011 was 5,824, in an area of 14.93 km2. On 28 January 2013 it merged with Eiras to form Eiras e São Paulo de Frades.

References 

Former parishes of Coimbra